The Black Box is the 25th novel by American crime author Michael Connelly, and the sixteenth novel featuring Los Angeles Police Department detective Harry Bosch. The book was published on 26 November 2012, "in part to honor the 20th anniversary of the character".

Plot
Bosch tackles a 20-year-old cold case which took place during the 1992 Los Angeles riots.
A white photojournalist is found killed near a burned-out store. Harry Bosch and Jerry Edgar were the original detectives called out to the scene. Riots Task Force later took up the case but it remained unsolved over the years. The case is reopened when Harry matches a shell casing he discovered at the scene to three other murders. Attempts to stall Harry's investigation by his supervisor as well as the police chief, to avoid a bad publicity fallout, fail. In his personal life, Harry's daughter Maddie says she wants to become a member of the LAPD, after having expressed an interest in a law enforcement career in The Drop. The story also introduces a part-time recurring character, Nancy Mendenhall, an IAD investigator. The 'Black Box', just like ones in the airlines, refers to the piece of the puzzle that will tie all ends together.

Reception
The book placed at #2 on the Chronicle bestseller list for San Francisco Bay Area booksellers, in December 2012.

In 2012, The Black Box won the world's most lucrative crime fiction award, the RBA Prize for Crime Writing worth €125,000.

References

2012 American novels
Harry Bosch series
Novels set in Los Angeles
American detective novels
Little, Brown and Company books